"Am I That Easy to Forget" is a popular song written by country music singer Carl Belew and W.S. Stevenson and published in 1958. Belew recorded his song in Nashville on December 17, 1958, and released the single in March 1959, when it reached number nine on the U.S. country music chart. Other country music artists who have recorded cover versions of the song include Skeeter Davis (#11 country, 1960), Ernest Tubb (1960), Jerry Wallace (1962), Gene Vincent (1966), George Jones (1967), Patti Page (1968), Jim Reeves (#12 country, 1973) and Prairie Oyster (1991).

In 1960, the singer and actress Debbie Reynolds recorded a version that reached number 25 on the U.S. pop chart. The highest charting version of the song on the U.S. pop chart was recorded by the singer Engelbert Humperdinck on August 11, 1967. Released as a single in late 1967 from his album The Last Waltz, it reached number 18 on the Hot 100 and number one on the Easy Listening chart in early 1968. Humperdinck's version was also a big hit in the United Kingdom, where it spent two weeks at number three on the UK Singles Chart, as well as in Ireland, where it spent three weeks at number one on the Irish Singles Chart. Humperdinck himself recorded a special version for Italy, in Italian, entitled "Dimenticarti non potrei" ("I couldn't forget you"). Petula Clark recorded the song in French as "Tu Reviendras Vers Ta Maison" ("You Will Come Back to Your Home") and Leon Russell recorded the song as "Hank Wilson" in 1973.

Chart performance

Carl Belew

Skeeter Davis

Debbie Reynolds

Esther Phillips

Engelbert Humperdinck

Jim Reeves

Orion

See also
List of number-one adult contemporary singles of 1968 (U.S.)
List of number-one singles of 1968 (Ireland)

References

1958 songs
1959 singles
1960 singles
1968 singles
1973 singles
Skeeter Davis songs
George Jones songs
Debbie Reynolds songs
Engelbert Humperdinck songs
Patti Page songs
Jim Reeves songs
Irish Singles Chart number-one singles
Carl Belew songs
Songs written by Carl Belew
Parrot Records singles
Song recordings produced by Peter Sullivan (record producer)
Songs written by W.S. Stevenson